Scabricola lavoisieri is a species of sea snail, a marine gastropod mollusc in the family Mitridae, the miters or miter snails.

Description
The length of the shell attains 16.7 mm.

Distribution
This marine species occurs off the Philippines.

References

 Guillot de Suduiraut E. 2002. Description d'une nouvelle espèce de mitre des Philippines (Sous-familles des Imbricariinae)(Gastropoda : Prosobranchia : Mitridae). Novapex 3(1): 47-49

External links
 Fedosov A., Puillandre N., Herrmann M., Kantor Yu., Oliverio M., Dgebuadze P., Modica M.V. & Bouchet P. (2018). The collapse of Mitra: molecular systematics and morphology of the Mitridae (Gastropoda: Neogastropoda). Zoological Journal of the Linnean Society. 183(2): 253-337

Mitridae
Gastropods described in 2002